Oxyrhynchus is a small genus of flowering plants in the legume family, Fabaceae. It belongs to the subfamily Faboideae. A key for the species in this genus has been published.

References

Phaseoleae
Fabaceae genera